Sophie Buddle is a Canadian stand-up comedian, originally from Ottawa.  She is most noted for her 2019 comedy album A Lil Bit of Buddle, which won the Juno Award for Comedy Album of the Year at the Juno Awards of 2020. She was the first woman ever to win the award as a solo stand-up comedian, although it was previously won in 1979 by the mixed-gender sketch comedy troupe Royal Canadian Air Farce.

Currently a television writer for the sketch comedy series This Hour Has 22 Minutes, she was a semi-finalist in the 2018 edition of SiriusXM Canada's "Canada's Top Comic" competition.

She is in a relationship with comedian Mayce Galoni, with whom she cohosts the podcast Obsessed.

References

21st-century Canadian comedians
Canadian stand-up comedians
Canadian women comedians
Comedians from Ontario
Comedians from Vancouver
Living people
Canadian television writers
Canadian women television writers
Writers from Vancouver
Year of birth missing (living people)
Juno Award for Comedy Album of the Year winners
Writers from Ottawa